The 2011–12 FC Zenit Saint Petersburg season was the 16th straight season that the club will play in the Russian Premier League, the highest tier of football in Russia. The club were the defending champions of both the Russian Premier League and the Russian Cup.

Internationally, the club participated in the 2011–12 UEFA Champions League, entering the competition in the group stage as a result of qualifying for the competition as the first place team from Russia.

Squad 
As of 21 October 2011. FC Zenit Saint Petersburg 2011–12

Season Events

Pre-season
Following the club's double in manager Luciano Spalletti's first season, Zenit made several moves in the winter. First, the loan deal of former Zenit youth player Anton Sosnin to Krylia Sovetov Samara was made permanent, and Yevgeni Starikov's loan to Tom Tomsk was renewed. Second, after a very successful 14-goal season with Tom Tomsk and Rubin Kazan, striker Sergei Kornilenko made his return to the club. On 14 January, Croatian defender Ivica Križanac, who had been with the club for the past six seasons and appeared in 100 Russian Premier League matches, was released by the club prior to his contract expiring in the summer of 2011.

On 15 January, the club departed for Dubai with 22 players for the first pre-season training session. However, 19-year-old striker Maksim Kanunnikov, who was a popular first-team substitute early in 2010 prior to the arrival of Aleksandr Bukharov, did not make the trip and was loaned to Tom Tomsk on 17 January until July 2012. The club also hosted the annual Commonwealth of Independent States Cup and were represented by youth team players. After qualifying for the knock-out round, Zenit defeated HJK Helsinki 2–1 in the quarterfinal thanks to a double by 19-year-old Stanislav Matyash before being eliminated by eventual champions Inter Baku in the semifinal.

On 29 January, Italian Alessandro Rosina was loaned to Serie A side Cesena until July 2011. On the final day of the English transfer window, striker Sergei Kornilenko was once again sent on loan, this time to Blackpool for the remainder of the 2010–11 Premier League season.

Match World Cup
In Dubai, the club participated in the 2011 Match World Cup, a friendly tournament including league winners from Europe and Asia. Zenit were drawn alongside defending Gambrunus liga champions Sparta Prague and defending Hazfi Cup winners, Persepolis of Iran. In the opening match against Sparta Prague, Zenit was fueled by a first-minute strike by Aleksandr Kerzhakov as the blue-whites cruised to a 3–0 victory.

Two days later, Kerzhakov had Zenit off and running against Persepolis with a seventh-minute goal, and 34-year-old Sergei Semak added the finishing touches in the second half with an open-net goal. With six points earned from two group stage matches, Zenit earned a date with Asia's Club of the 20th Century, Al-Hilal in the championship.

After a first half stalemate at the Al-Maktoum Stadium, Szabolcs Huszti finally broke the match open with a 63rd-minute strike. But Al-Hilal would not go quietly. Zenit substitute Danko Lazović was sent off in extra time and Romanian Mirel Rădoi scored in the 93rd minute for Al-Hilal to send the match to penalties. From the spot kicks, the Arabian side were perfect from all four shooters, while both Roman Shirokov and Fernando Meira were off the mark for Zenit, eventually falling 4–1 on penalties.

March
Only days before the start of the new season, Zenit signed 19-year-old Chilean left-back Nicolás Peñailillo on a loan deal from Everton de Viña del Mar.

Zenit opened their 2011–12 Russian Premier League campaign on March 13 against Terek Grozny, where Serbian Danko Lazović delivered the only goal of the match in a 1–0 Zenit victory. It took only 14 minutes for Danny to pick out Lazović with a cross and goalkeeper Vyacheslav Malafeev made several excellent saves to deny new Terek manager Ruud Gullit his first points in Russia. After falling to Twente in the Europa League, the club was hit with tragedy on a personal level when they learned of the death of Malafeev's wife Marina, who was killed in a car crash on 17 March. Three days later, the club played its first home match of the season against an inspired Anzhi Makhachkala side led by former Brazilian international and Real Madrid left-back Roberto Carlos. Zenit midfielder Roman Shirokov opened the scoring just four minutes in and then just seconds before half-time, Lazović scored his second of the season to put the sine-byelo-goluboy up 2–0, a scoreline that would hold up for Luciano Spalletti's second victory of the year.

Roberto Carlos incident 
Following the match on 20 March, Brazilian media reported that Anzhi captain Roberto Carlos was racially abused by a Zenit fan as the two teams took the field. A picture surfaced that revealed the fan offering a banana to the 37-year-old as he entered the pitch, however Russian journalist Boris Bogdanov argued against the allegations of racism, citing that the picture was taken at an "unfavorable angle" and it could not be known for sure if his intention was to offend. Even though there had been incidents of banana-throwing in Saint Petersburg before, there were none during the Anzhi match or any other sort of incident. Roberto Carlos, who initially stated, "In my 37 years I have seen everything, I'm not going to be upset after seeing a banana", and that it didn't make him feel uncomfortable, later demanded action from the Russian Football Union (RFU).

On 7 April, the RFU fined Zenit €7,400 and the club claimed it had banned the offending fan for life.

April
After a perfect start to the new season, the club travelled to Nalchik to face a Spartak Nalchuk side that had exceeded all expectations by finishing 6th in 2010 and once more, Sergei Tashuev's squad proved to be worthy competition. Despite an early strike from Aleksandr Kerzhakov, Spartak leveled the score on 60 minutes. Danko Lazović then scored his third goal in three matches in the 80th minute, which appeared to be the winner before 25-year-old Roman Kontsedalov brought the home side back on even terms again. For the sixth time in seven league matches, Spartak had scored multiple goals against Zenit and Spalletti's side left with a 2–2 draw.

On 10 April, Zenit hoste CSKA Moscow in a highly anticipated duel at the Petrovsky Stadium. The match ended 1–1, however the official result awarded a 3–0 victory to CSKA. According to the league regulations, every team has to put at least one player with a Russian citizenship born in 1990 or later on their game roster in every game (even if the player in question stays on the bench). If there is no such player or players, the team guilty is punished by the victory being awarded to their opponent and a fine. In the game Zenit did not have such a player in their lineup – the youngest player was born in 1989. After the game, RFU president Sergei Fursenko said that Zenit would likely be awarded a defeat for breaking the regulations. Zenit manager Luciano Spalletti said after the game that they did this intentionally, as they were told it is punishable by a fine only, and the team was ready to pay the fine. They have done the same thing in the 2010 season and fine was the only punishment. However, the regulations were updated in December 2010, and the current exact language of Article 109 of the Disciplinary Regulations of the RFU states it is punishable by "a defeat awarded and a fine", not "a defeat awarded or a fine". Zenit was awarded a defeat by the RFU on 13 April. Zenit removed Vladislav Radimov, who as team director was responsible for filing the game roster with the league, from his position to the reserve team's assistant coach position, with a reduction in salary. Zenit's lawyer was punished by the club by having his bonus cancelled.

Following the RFU decision, the Premier League further decided that the goals scored by Mark González and Konstantin Zyryanov would not count for their scoring totals, but the yellow cards received in the game would count for disciplinary purposes.

Following the events of 10 April, Zenit closed out the month strong with resounding victories over Amkar Perm (3–1) and Krylia Sovetov (3–0). After a double against Krylia, Danko Lazović had run his scoring total to five goals in six matches.

May
Zenit hit a brick wall on their first trip to Krasnodar, failing to score against the newly promoted Bulls. The club could not pick up full points in either of their next two matches either, drawing with Rubin Kazan and Lokomotiv Moscow. An early low point then came on 21 May as the club traveled to Tomsk. Tom Tomsk took an early lead off former Zenit youth star Yevgeni Starikov's 37th-minute goal. Another youngster, Aleksei Ionov, leveled the score for Zenit just four minutes later, but it was ultimately 23-year-old Pavel Golyshev who had the last laugh as he secured a 2–1 victory for Tomsk. The tally was Golyshev's sixth of the season.

To finish off the month before a week of international break, Zenit would have to face arch-rival Spartak Moscow. After a heated first half-hour of play, it was Lazović to the rescue once more, putting Zenit ahead in the 37th minute with a clever penalty. The goal seemed to open the game up considerably and Aleksandr Kerzhakov netted a double in the second half, with the first of the two coming off an artful one-time shot.

June
After the club's most resounding victory of the season on 14 June, a 4–0 win over Rostov, Portuguese midfielder Danny signed a contract extension to remain with Zenit until 2015.

Several days later, following the club's 2–0 victory over Volga Nizhny Novgorod, star striker Danko Lazović was tasered by police for giving his jersey to a fan in the crowd. "I just went to give my jersey to the fans after the match, when a police officer appeared behind me and tasered me in the back with his electric shocker. I don't know why that happened. Maybe he thought that I was one of the fans", explained Lazović on Zenit's official website, while the club itself vented its anger against the actions of the police.

Just after entering the Russian Premier League's one-month summer break, the club signed Italian left-back Domenico Criscito from Genoa for a sum of €11 million.

Statistics

Field
As of 26 June 2011

Goalkeeping
As of 26 June 2011

Transfers

Ownership

In

Out

Loan

In

Out

For recent transfers, see List of Russian football transfers winter 2010–11 and List of Russian football transfers summer 2011

Matches

Russian Premier League

Table

UEFA Champions League

Group stage – Group G

Pre-season

2011 CIS Cup

Group stage

Knockout phase

Russian Cup

Russian Super Cup

References

FC Zenit Saint Petersburg seasons
Zenit Saint Petersburg
Zenit Saint Petersburg
Russian football championship-winning seasons